Feathergrass is a common name for several plants and may refer to:

Nassella,  a genus of bunchgrasses
Stipa, a genus of perennial hermaphroditic grasses